Luminous infrared galaxies or LIRGs are galaxies with luminosities, the measurement of brightness, above . They are also referred to as submillimeter galaxies (SMGs) through their normal method of detection. LIRGs are more abundant than starburst galaxies, Seyfert galaxies and quasi-stellar objects at comparable luminosity. Infrared galaxies emit more energy in the infrared than at all other wavelengths combined. A LIRG's luminosity is 100 billion times that of the Sun.

Galaxies with luminosities above  are ultraluminous infrared galaxies (ULIRGs). Galaxies exceeding  are characterised as hyper-luminous infrared galaxies (HyLIRGs). Those exceeding  are extremely luminous infrared galaxies (ELIRGs). Many of the LIRGs and ULIRGs are showing interactions and disruptions. Many of these types of galaxies spawn about 100 new stars a year as compared to the Milky Way which spawns one a year; this helps create the high level of luminosity.

Discovery and characteristics 
Infrared galaxies appear to be single, gas-rich spirals whose infrared luminosity is created largely by the formation of stars within them. These types of galaxies were discovered in 1983 with IRAS. A LIRG's excess infrared luminosity may also come from the presence of an active galactic nucleus (AGN) residing at the center.

These galaxies emit more energy in the infrared portion of the spectrum, not visible to the naked eye. The energy given off by LIRGs is comparable to that of a quasar (a type of AGN), which formerly was known as the most energetic object in the universe.

LIRGs are brighter in the infrared than in the optical spectrum because the visible light is absorbed by the high amounts of gas and dust, and the dust re-emits thermal energy in the infrared spectrum.

LIRGs are known to exist in denser parts of the universe than non-LIRGs.

ULIRG

LIRGs are also capable of becoming Ultra Luminous Infrared Galaxys (ULIRGs) but there is no perfect timetable because not all LIRGs turn into ULIRGs, Newtonian mechanics is used in the calculations and because the constraints are not quite approximate. Studies have shown that ULIRGs are more likely to contain an AGN than LIRGs

According to one study a ULIRG is just part of an evolutionary galaxy merger scenario. In essence, two or more spiral galaxies, galaxies that consist of a flat, rotating disk containing stars, gas and dust and a central concentration of stars known as the bulge, merge to form an early stage merger. An early stage merger in this case can also be identified as a LIRG. After that, it becomes a late stage merger, which is a ULIRG. It then becomes a quasar and in the final stage of the evolution it becomes an elliptical galaxy. This can be evidenced by the fact that stars are much older in elliptical galaxies than those found in the earlier stages of the evolution.

HyLIRG
Hyper luminous Infrared Galaxies (HyLIRG), also referred to as HiLIRGs and HLIRGs,  are considered to be some of the most luminous persistent objects in the Universe, exhibiting extremely high star formation rates, and most of which are known to harbour Active Galactic Nuclei (AGN). They are defined as galaxies with luminosities above 1013 L⊙, as distinct from the less luminous population of ULIRGs (L = 1012 – 1013 L⊙). HLIRGs were first identified through follow-up observations of the IRAS mission.

IRAS F10214+4724, a HyLIRG being gravitationally lensed by a foreground elliptical galaxy, was considered to be one of the most luminous objects in the Universe having an intrinsic luminosity of ~ 2 × 1013 L⊙. It is believed that the bolometric luminosity of this HLIRG is likely amplified by a factor of ~30 as a result of the gravitational lensing.

The majority (~80%) of the mid-infrared spectrum of these objects is found to be dominated by AGN emission. However, the starburst (SB) activity is known to be significant in all known sources with a mean SB contribution of ~30%. Star formation rates in HLIRGs have been shown to reach ~ 3×102 – 3×103 M⊙ yr−1.

ELIRG
The Extremely Luminous Infrared Galaxy WISE J224607.57-052635.0, with a luminosity of 300 trillion suns was discovered by NASA's Wide-field Infrared Survey Explorer (WISE), and as of May 2015 is the most luminous galaxy found. The galaxy belongs to a new class of objects discovered by WISE, extremely luminous infrared galaxies, or ELIRGs.

Light from the WISE J224607.57-052635.0 galaxy has traveled 12.5 billion years. The black hole at its center was billions of times the mass of the Sun when the universe was a tenth (1.3 billion years) of its present age of 13.8 billion years.

There are three reasons the black holes in the ELIRGs could be massive. First, the embryonic black holes might be bigger than thought possible. Second, the Eddington limit was exceeded. When a black hole feeds, gas falls in and heats, emitting light. The pressure of the emitted light forces the gas outward, creating a limit to how fast the black hole can continuously absorb matter. If a black hole broke this limit, it could theoretically increase in size at a fast rate. Black holes have previously been observed breaking this limit; the black hole in the study would have had to repeatedly break the limit to grow this large. Third, the black holes might just be bending this limit, absorbing gas faster than thought possible, if the black hole is not spinning fast. If a black hole spins slowly, it will not repel its gas absorption as much. A slow-spinning black hole can absorb more matter than a fast-spinning black hole. The massive black holes in ELIRGs could be absorbing matter for a longer time.

Twenty new ELIRGs, including the most luminous galaxy found to date, have been discovered. These galaxies were not found earlier because of their distance, and because dust converts their visible light into infrared light.  One has been observed to have three star-forming areas.

Observations

IRAS 
The Infrared Astronomical Satellite (IRAS) was the first all-sky survey which used far-infrared wavelengths, in 1983.  In that survey, tens of thousands of galaxies were detected, many of which would not have been recorded in previous surveys. It is now clear that the reason the number of detections has risen is that the majority of LIRGs in the universe emitted the bulk of their energy in the far infrared. Using the IRAS, scientists were able to determine the luminosity of the galactic objects discovered. The telescope was a joint project of the United States (NASA), Netherlands (NIVR), and the United Kingdom (SERC). Over 250,000 infrared sources were observed during this 10-month mission.

GOALS 
The Great Observatories All-sky LIRG Survey (GOALS) is a multi-wavelength study of luminous infrared galaxies, incorporating observations with NASA's Great Observatories and other ground and space-based telescopes. Using information from NASA's Spitzer, Hubble, Chandra and Galex observations in a study over 200 of the most luminous infrared selected galaxies in the local universe. Approximately 180 LIRGs were identified along with over 20 ULIRGs. The LIRGs and ULIRGs targeted in GOALS span the full range of nuclear spectral types (type-1 and type 2 Active Galactic Nuclei, LINERS's, and starbursts) and interaction stages (major mergers, minor mergers, and isolated galaxies).

List
Some examples of extremely notable LIRGs, ULIRGs, HLIRGs, ELIRGs

Image gallery

References

External links 
 Nearby Extreme Galaxies Linked To Humble Roots (SpaceDaily) Jun 07, 2006
 How To Bake A Galaxy (SpaceDaily) Jun 19, 2006
 The Great Observatory All-sky LIRG Survey

Active galaxy types